Justinian Jessup (born May 23, 1998) is an American professional basketball player who played for the Basket Zaragoza of the Liga ACB. He played college basketball for the Boise State Broncos.  Jessup was selected by the Golden State Warriors as the 51st overall pick of the 2020 NBA draft.

Early life and high school career
Jessup lived in Boise during fourth and fifth grades and played club basketball under former Bronco basketball player Roberto Bergersen. He spent long hours in the gym as a small child improving his basketball game.

Jessup lettered four years at Longmont High School. As a junior, he led the team in every major statistical category with averages of 17.0 points, 4.5 rebounds, 2.5 assists, and 3.2 steals per game while leading Longmont to the state title game. He was named the 2015 Colorado 4A Player of the Year, Northern League Athlete of the Year, and was selected to the all-state first team.

In his senior season, he was ranked the No. 8 prospect in Colorado. He signed his letter of intent to play for Boise State on September 12, 2015. He averaged 18.3 points and 4.9 rebounds per game and led Longmont to a 25–2 record, while once again being selected to the all-state first team and named the Northern League Athlete of the Year.

College career
In his first nine games for Boise State, Jessup averaged 9.4 points per game. He scored 20 points in a win over Presbyterian, becoming the 11th Bronco freshman to score 20 points in a game. Jessup's play drew comparison to former Boise State player Anthony Drmic. “His feel for the game is so good, and he’s a worker,” coach Leon Rice said.

Jessup averaged 15.0 points per game in the first nine games of his sophomore season and led the team to an 8–1 start. Jessup was publicly reprimanded after his role in a court scuffle in a win against New Mexico on February 6, 2018. He averaged 11.6 points per game as the second option behind Chandler Hutchison and hit 46 percent of his three-point attempts.

As a junior, Jessup led the Broncos in scoring (14.0 points per game), rebounds (4.5 per game), assists (2.7 per game), steals and blocks. Jessup was named to Third-Team All Mountain West following his junior season. He played most of the season through knee pain and had surgery in April 2019.

On December 7, 2019, Jessup set career highs with 27 points and seven 3-pointers, as Boise State defeated the Colorado State Rams 75–64. Jessup made his 276th career three-pointer in a game against UNLV on January 8, 2020, breaking Anthony Drmic's Boise State record. He finished with 18 points to help the Broncos win 73–66. On February 4, 2020 Jessup broke the Mountain West Conference record for career three-pointers when he passed BYU's Jimmer Fredette's mark of 296. At the conclusion of the regular season, Jessup was named to the Second Team All-Mountain West. He averaged 16.0 points, 4.4 rebounds, 2.1 assists and 1.4 steals per game.

Professional career

Illawarra Hawks (2020–2022)
On August 28, 2020, Jessup signed a Next Stars contract with the Illawarra Hawks of the Australian National Basketball League (NBL).

On November 18, 2020, Jessup was selected by the Golden State Warriors with the 51st pick in the 2020 NBA draft.

On November 1, 2021, Jessup returned to the Hawks for his second season of his NBL Next Stars contract.

Career statistics

College

|-
| style="text-align:left;"| 2016–17
| style="text-align:left;"| Boise State
| 32 || 31 || 23.6 || .377 || .355 || .767 || 2.8 || 1.4 || 1.0 || .3 || 7.4
|-
| style="text-align:left;"| 2017–18
| style="text-align:left;"| Boise State
| 32 || 25 || 29.5 || .465 || .457 || .795 || 4.7 || 1.8 || 1.3 || .6 || 11.6
|-
| style="text-align:left;"| 2018–19
| style="text-align:left;"| Boise State
| 33 || 32 || 35.5 || .445 || .410 || .731 || 4.5 || 2.7 || 1.1 || .5 || 14.0
|-
| style="text-align:left;"| 2019–20
| style="text-align:left;"| Boise State
| 32 || 32 || 36.0 || .426 || .397 || .959 || 4.4 || 2.1 || 1.4 || .5 || 16.0
|- class="sortbottom"
| style="text-align:center;" colspan="2"| Career
| 129 || 120 || 31.2 || .432 || .408 || .831 || 4.1 || 2.0 || 1.2 || .5 || 12.3

NBL

|-
| style="text-align:left;"|2020–21
| style="text-align:left;"|Illawarra
| 38 || − || 30.9 || .420 || .343 || .750 || 3.7 || 1.7 || 1.2 || .6 || 13.2
|-
| style="text-align:left;"|2021–22
| style="text-align:left;"|Illawarra
| 28 || − || 31.84 || .450 || .360 || .860 || 3.79 || 1.64 || 1.18 || .5 || 13.33

References

External links
Boise State Broncos bio
NBL Player Profile

1998 births
Living people
American expatriate basketball people in Australia
American expatriate basketball people in Spain
American men's basketball players
Basket Zaragoza players
Basketball players from Colorado
Boise State Broncos men's basketball players
Golden State Warriors draft picks
Illawarra Hawks players
Liga ACB players
People from Longmont, Colorado
Shooting guards